Lord Derby's Young Professionals' Tournament was a golf tournament on the British PGA Circuit that was played from 1968 to 1974. From 1968 to 1971 it was a stroke play tournament for under-23 professionals. In 1968 it was over 72 holes while in 1969 it was reduced to a 54 hole event. From 1972 and 1974 it was a match-play event with the age limit increased to 25. The tournament was supported by Lord Derby, the president of the PGA.

Winners

References

Golf tournaments in England
Recurring sporting events established in 1968
Recurring sporting events disestablished in 1974